The  Cincinnati Rockers season was the first season for the arena football franchise. The Rockers finished 7–3 and lost in the playoffs to the Tampa Bay Storm.

Regular season

Schedule

Standings

z – clinched homefield advantage

y – clinched division title

x – clinched playoff spot

Playoffs

Roster

References

External links
1992 Cincinnati Rockers on ArenaFan.com

1992 Arena Football League season
1992 in sports in Ohio
Cincinnati Rockers seasons